Rondina is a surname. Notable people with the surname include:
 Cherry Rondina (born 1996), Filipina volleyball player
 Sergio Rondina (born 1971), Argentine football manager
 William Rondina, American fashion designer and philanthropist

See also
 Jevgenia Rõndina (born 1989), Estonian rower